is a Japanese manga series written and illustrated by Yuu Watase. It began with a one-shot, published in Shogakukan's Monthly Flowers magazine in February 2015. The full series, Byakko Senki, launched in the same magazine in August 2017. It has been on hiatus since August 2018, due to Watase's health issues.

Byakko Senki is a prequel to Fushigi Yûgi, a sequel to Fushigi Yûgi: Genbu Kaiden, and the final installment in the Fushigi Yûgi "Four Gods" storyline. It tells the story of the Priestess of Byakko, Suzuno Ohsugi, in the land of Xi-Lang after she was transported into The Universe of the Four Gods. The Byakko Ibun one-shot, on the other hand, sets the mood for Byakko Senki by introducing one of its protagonists, a girl from Xi-Lang named Ning-Lan, and her companion Nirusha.

In Japan, Shogakukan published the series' first compiled volume in April 2018. In North America, Viz Media licensed the manga for an English-language release and published its first volume in August 2020.

Synopsis

Byakko Ibun
Some time between Genbu Kaiden and Byakko Senki, a man named Nirusha travels to a small village in the country of Xi-Lang. The village is under attack by a wild tiger, and the only person who agrees to help him strike it down is the youngest daughter of the local inn keeper, a little girl named Rei-Pin. Nirusha then hides from the suspicious villagers, but Rei-Pin tries to befriend him. It is revealed that she has a terrible life, full of neglect and abuse from her family, and Nirusha is the first person who has ever been kind to her. Nirusha renames her "Ning-Lan" and tells her about his past, and the two try to help one another.

Byakko Senki
In 1923, almost immediately following the epilogue of Genbu Kaiden, the scholar Takao Ohsugi brings the book The Universe of Four Gods back to Tokyo under the will of the deceased translator of the book, Einosuke Okuda, to find a way to destroy it or seal it away. No matter what he does, however, the book is not affected by anything. Takao fears deeply for his 8-year-old daughter Suzuno Ohsugi, who may be trapped in the book just like Takiko Okuda (the Genbu Kaiden heroine, whom Suzuno considered an older sister figure); even more, the book is sometimes found near Suzuno.

Months later, the Great Kantō earthquake takes place. The Ohsugi house collapses, Takao's wife Tamayo is killed, and Takao is mortally wounded, but then Suzuno turns out to be all right and has the Universe in her hands. Takao realizes that this is the doing of the Universe and that Suzuno is destined to be a priestess. With his last words, he orders Suzuno to open the book and get inside it for her own safety, telling her that she'll find her own destiny like Takiko.

Lost in the wide desert, Suzuno meets Ning-Lan, an outcast young woman (and one of the protagonists of Byakko Ibun) who can transform into a fierce tiger. She also meets the kindhearted brothers Kasal and Karm Laotse. After a short time, the three realize that Suzuno fits the description of the outlandish priestess who is destined to summon the godly beast of Byakko and save the country from the inevitable peril. When Ning-Lan is tasked to escort Suzuno to the royal guards, the mentally unstable girl snaps and attempts to kill Suzuno, but she is transported back to reality. Ning-Lan then imposes herself as the priestess, to avenge her tragic past in which she was abused by near every person she met, save for a man named Nirusha (the other Byakko Ibun lead).

Suzuno finds herself all alone in the destroyed Tokyo, but by a stroke of luck she's found by Dr. Oikawa, a friend of her father and Takiko's former fiancé. The kind doctor adopts her and three other orphans (Seiji Horie, Hideo, and Kenichi), but Suzuno loses sight of the book itself.

Ten years pass. Suzuno is in her last year of high school and has become a promising artist, but then finds the Universe in her school's library. This triggers her lost memories of her adventures inside the book, so she starts researching its translator. Soon, she and her foster father Oikawa discover everything about the tragedy of the Okuda family, Takiko's position as the Priestess of Genbu, and the truth of the book: that the priestess is to be devoured by the godly beast upon being granted all three wishes. Scared and hesitant about this grim destiny, Suzuno accepts the proposal of her adopted brother Seiji to escape that fate, but the book suddenly appears and absorbs her right before the eyes of Oikawa and her fiancé.

Characters

Reality

Suzuno is the girl destined to become the Priestess of Byakko. She is a quiet, kind highschool student who resembles the  archetype.
Suzuno first enters the Universe of the Four Gods world as a little girl in 1923, during the Great Kantō earthquake that kills her parents and destroys her home. After a day or so, she is sent back to Tokyo and, as Dr. Oikawa takes her in, she loses sight of the book. She doesn't find it again until 10 years later, in 1933, and is taken inside it for a second time.

Suzuno's mother, a kindhearted housewife. She also dies in the earthquake, and when Suzuno is sent into the book, she's wearing her mother's best kimono as a sort-of coat.

Suzuno's father, who showed up in the Genbu Kaiden story. He is a journalist and writer who worked for the scholar Einosuke Okuda and inherited the Four Gods manuscript. He intends to destroy it so Suzuno and other girls won't be taken inside it, but no matter what methods he uses, the book "survives" due to its magic. He dies in the Kantō earthquake, but before that he sends Suzuno inside the book for her protection.

A physician also seen in Fushigi Yûgi: Genbu Kaiden, an old friend of the Okuda and Ohsugi families. He proposed to Takiko Okuda, and while he was initially accepted, he was shortly turned down. He survives the Kantō earthquake and adopts Suzuno, Seiji, Kenichi, and Hidero. In Byakko Senki, Oikawa learns about the truth of Takiko's death as the Priestess of Genbu and dissuades Suzuno to follow Takiko's footstep.

An older boy who rescues Suzuno from child traffickers after the Great Kantō earthquake, prompting their adoptions by Dr. Oikawa. Years later, he enrolls in the Imperial Japanese Army Academy to further research the book The Universe of Four Gods, and by that time, he proposes to Suzuno.

The Universe of Four Gods
 /  / 
The younger self of the cruel Seiryuu Celestial Warrior Miboshi, and one of the protagonists from Byakko Ibun. He is a quiet and aloof spell-caster who travels around looking for tigers to hunt. He arrives to Rei-Pin's village and strikes a friendship with her.

 / 
The other Byakko Ibun protagonist, a little girl who lives in a village in the Xi-Lang empire and is badly abused by her family. She strikes a friendship with Nirusha, who helps her start working towards her own self-improvement. Unbeknownst to her, however, she has a mysterious heritage.
Ning-Lan reappears on her own in Byakko Senki, as a powerful but bitter and deeply hurt traveler and sorceress. She's the first person that a young Suzuno properly interacts with in Xi-Lang, and they're both taken in by the Laotse brothers.

One of the Byakko Celestial Warriors, and Suzuno's love. While a man named Kasal Laotse is the biggest candidate to be Tatara, there are some hints that he might be Kasal's younger brother Karm.
Kasal, the most likely Tatara "candidate", was a young man from an apparently affluent family in a small Xi-Lang village. However, a sandstorm and an earthquake destroyed his hometown and he could only save his little brother and himself. Ever since then the brothers have traveled together through Xi-Lang, making their lives as merchants, with Kasal raising Karm as well as possible. He immediately takes Suzuno under his wing and is the first person to realize that she is the Priestess of Byakko.

Tokaki is another Byakko Celestial Warrior, seen in the original series as an elderly martial artist. Here he appears at his prime, as a Xi-Lang palace guard who rescues Suzuno when she reappears in the world of the book. He at first intends to ask Suzuno to spend the night with him as a reward for saving her, but seems to drop the matter when he deduces that she is the priestess.

Publication

Fushigi Yûgi: Byakko Senki is written and illustrated by Yuu Watase. It started as a 51-page one-shot, Fushigi Yûgi: Byakko Ibun, published in the April 2015 issue of Shogakukan's  manga magazine Monthly Flowers on February 28, 2015. Watase launched the full series, Byakko Senki, two years later in the October 2017 issue of Monthly Flowers on August 28, 2017. The manga was serialized every other month until August 28, 2018, when it was placed on hiatus due to Watase's "poor physical condition". Shogakukan published the first compiled volume of Byakko Senki under the Flower Comics Alpha imprint on April 10, 2018. Viz Media licensed the manga in English and published the first volume under the Shojo Beat imprint on August 4, 2020. At the end of the first volume, Watase revealed that Byakko Senki will be the final installment in the Fushigi Yûgi "Four Gods" storyline; she vowed to "work hard to finish the story", despite her health issues.

Reception
Caitlin Moore of Anime News Network called Fushigi Yûgi: Byakko Senki a "must-read for longtime Fushigi Yûgi fans" and "worth a look even for newcomers to the saga." She praised its "gorgeous" artwork and "strong characterization", noting that Watase has a "gift for ... communicating their characters' mental and emotional states without them needing to say a word." However, Moore criticized the first volume for feeling "more like a prologue than anything else", something she said she "wouldn't take issue with" if the series hadn't been on hiatus since 2018. Krystallina and Helen of TheOASG echoed these sentiments in their review; they called Byakko Senki a "beautiful, nostalgia-filled return to Watase's biggest classic", but said the manga's slow set-up and the wait for subsequent volumes made it "hard to give it an enthusiastic recommendation". Anthony Gramuglia of Comic Book Resources, on the other hand, praised Byakko Senki as "absolutely incredible" and "essential reading for any fan of fantasy manga." He felt that, with its first volume, the series is "managing to surpass the original" Fushigi Yûgi.

References

External links
 

2017 manga
Fantasy anime and manga
Fushigi Yûgi
Josei manga
Romance anime and manga
Shogakukan manga
Viz Media manga
Yuu Watase